Richard Sutton (ca 1815 – July 12, 1870) was an Irish-born political figure in New Brunswick, Canada. He represented Westmorland County in the Legislative Assembly of New Brunswick from 1854 to 1861 and 1865 to 1870.

He was born in Sutton, County Wexford and came to New Brunswick in 1829 to join his brother John. He married Mary Lowes in 1848. He served as deputy treasurer for the town of Newcastle, a justice of the peace and judge in the Court of Common Pleas. Sutton served in the province's Executive Council  as Surveyor General from 1867 to 1869.

References 
The Canadian parliamentary companion, HJ Morgan (1869)
The Irish In Early New Brunswick, Irish Canadian Cultural Association of New Brunswick

1870 deaths
Members of the Legislative Assembly of New Brunswick
Members of the Executive Council of New Brunswick
Irish emigrants to pre-Confederation New Brunswick
Year of birth uncertain
Colony of New Brunswick people
Colony of New Brunswick judges